Fernando Cagigal de la Vega y Martínez Niño de San Miguel y Pacheco, 4th Marquess of Casa Cagigal (1756–1824) was a Spanish soldier, poet, and playwright.

1756 births
1824 deaths
Spanish dramatists and playwrights
Spanish male dramatists and playwrights
Spanish poets
Spanish male poets